This article is about the particular significance of the year 1956 to Wales and its people.

Incumbents

Archbishop of Wales – John Morgan, Bishop of Llandaff
Archdruid of the National Eisteddfod of Wales – Dyfnallt

Events
April – One of the last Welsh-built naval vessels afloat, former iron screw frigate , built at Pembroke Dock, arrives in Belgium to be broken up.
2 April – Huw Wheldon marries Jacqueline Clarke.
24 April – A 250,000 signature petition is presented to the Westminster parliament by the all-party Parliament for Wales Campaign.
9 May – The Gower Peninsula becomes the first area in the British Isles to be designated an Area of Outstanding Natural Beauty.
9 July – Mettoy introduce Corgi Toys model cars, manufactured at Fforestfach in South Wales.
September – Bangor Normal College and Trinity College, Carmarthen, introduce courses in Welsh-medium teaching.
 4 September – Opening of the first Welsh-medium secondary school in Wales – Ysgol Glan Clwyd, Rhyl.
22 November – In a mining accident at Lewis Merthyr Colliery, seven men are killed.
exact date unknown – Aberystwyth's town clock is demolished as unsafe.

Arts and literature
Welsh language periodical Y Faner is bought by Huw T. Edwards and thus saved from going out of business.
Morecambe and Wise are reunited by chance at the Swansea Empire Theatre.
22 November – The New Scientist is launched by Percy Cudlipp, who becomes its first editor.

Awards

National Eisteddfod of Wales (held in Aberdare)
National Eisteddfod of Wales: Chair – Mathonwy Hughes, "Gwraig"
National Eisteddfod of Wales: Crown – withheld
National Eisteddfod of Wales: Prose Medal – W. T. Gruffydd, "Y Pwrpas Mawr"

New books

English language
Margiad Evans – A Candle Ahead
Bertrand Russell – Portraits from Memory and Other Essays

Welsh language
Huw T. Edwards – Tros y Tresi
Islwyn Ffowc Elis – Yn Ôl i Leifior
David Rees Griffiths – Caneuon Amanwy
Kate Roberts – Y Byw sy'n Cysgu
Waldo Williams – Dail Pren

Music
February – Release of Shirley Bassey's first single, Burn My Candle (At Both Ends)
William Mathias – Suite for Trumpet and Piano, Op.4
Grace Williams – Symphony No. 2

Film
Richard Burton stars in Alexander the Great; William Squire also appears.
Glynis Johns stars in The Court Jester.
Edmund Gwenn makes his last film appearance.
Moby Dick partly filmed at Lower Fishguard.

Broadcasting
The BBC Light Programme becomes available on VHF from Wenvoe.

Welsh-language television
Granada Television begins producing up to an hour a week of current affairs and education programmes in Welsh to serve the overlap audience in north Wales.

English-language television
June – First televised English-language play produced in Wales, Wind of Heaven.

Sport
Boxing
27 August – Joe Erskine defeats Johnny Williams in Cardiff to win the vacant British heavyweight title.
Rugby Union
Wales under the captaincy of Cliff Morgan, win the Five Nations Championship for the fifth time this decade.
24 March – Wales beat France 5–3 in a game held at the National Stadium, Cardiff
BBC Wales Sports Personality of the Year – Joe Erskine

Births
7 January – Johnny Owen, boxer (died 1980)
7 April – Christine Chapman AM, politician
May – Iwan Bala, artist
14 June – Keith Pontin, international footballer (died 2020)
22 July – Richard Gwyn writer
7 September – Byron Stevenson, footballer (died 2007)
3 November – Carl Harris, international footballer
4 December – Nia Griffith MP, politician, born in Ireland
19 December – John Griffiths, politician
23 December – Robert Gwilym, actor
date unknown – David Nott, surgeon

Deaths

4 January – Robert Williams Parry, poet, 71
10 January – Jack Johns, cricketer, 70
14 January – Sam Ramsey, Wales international rugby union player
23 January – William Harris, academic and translator, 71
1 February – John Lloyd-Jones, academic, 70 
22 February – Nathaniel Walters, Wales international rugby player, 80
27 February – Tudor Rees, lawyer, judge and Liberal politician, 75
19 May – Peter Freeman, politician, 67
8 June – Walter Rice, 7th Baron Dynevor, soldier, civil servant and politician, 82
5 July – Fred Birt, Welsh international rugby union player, 69
11 June – Frank Brangwyn, artist, 89
17 August – William Havard, Bishop of St. Davids and international rugby player, 66
31 August – Winifred Coombe Tennant, politician and philanthropist, 81
13 September – David Davies, footballer, 77
20 September – Arthur Tysilio Johnson, farmer and author, 83
1 October – J. O. Francis, dramatist, 74
11 October – David James Davies, economist and politician, 63
16 October – Robert Evans (Cybi), historian, 84
18 October – Harry Parry, jazz musician, 44
22 November – Rhys Hopkin Morris MP, politician, 68
16 December – Nina Hamnett, artist, 66
28 December – John Dyfnallt Owen, poet and archdruid, 83

See also
1956 in Northern Ireland

References